Vati or VATI may refer to:

Places
Vati (Rhodes) (Greek: βάτι), a village on the Greek island of Rhodes

People
Daya Vati, mother of Guru Ram Das
Daya Vati, wife of Dharma Vira

Other
Vati (novel), 1987 novella by Peter Schneider (writer)
Vati (German: Daddy), nickname of Werner Mölders
Vati und Sohn, nickname for the German Mistel aircraft
VATI, acronym meaning "vote against the incumbents"

See also
Vati-Con scandal